Xue Cuilan (born 1 April 1963) is a Chinese basketball player. She competed in the women's tournament at the 1988 Summer Olympics.

References

1963 births
Living people
Chinese women's basketball players
Olympic basketball players of China
Basketball players at the 1988 Summer Olympics
Place of birth missing (living people)
Asian Games medalists in basketball
Asian Games gold medalists for China
Asian Games silver medalists for China
Basketball players at the 1986 Asian Games
Basketball players at the 1990 Asian Games
Medalists at the 1986 Asian Games
Medalists at the 1990 Asian Games